Klimpen may refer to:

Nickname for Swedish ice hockey goalkeeper Lennart Häggroth
Fictional character in the Bert diaries, see Klimpen